The Alkali Canyon Formation is a geologic formation in Oregon. It preserves fossils dating back to the Tortonian to Zanclean stages (Hemphillian) of the Neogene period.

Fossil content 
The following fossils have been recovered from the formation:

 Eucyon davisi
 Hypolagus oregonensis
 Neotamias malloryi
 Oregonomys pebblespringsensis
 Perognathus stevei
 Plesiogulo marshalli
 Pliotaxidea nevadensis
 Scapanus proceridens
 Spermophilus shotwelli
 S. wilsoni
 Castor sp.
 Dipoides sp.
 Mammut sp.
 Megalonyx sp.
 Teleoceras sp.
 Archaeolaginae indet.
 Camelidae indet.
 Canini indet.
 Carnivora indet.
 Cricetidae indet.
 Dipodomyinae indet.
 Equini indet.
 Hipparionini indet.
 Procyonidae indet.
 Sciuridae indet.
 Tayassuinae indet.
 Ursidae indet.

See also 
 List of fossiliferous stratigraphic units in Oregon
 Paleontology in Oregon

References

Bibliography 
 

Neogene geology of Oregon
Miocene Series of North America
Messinian
Tortonian
Pliocene Series of North America
Zanclean
Hemphillian
Sandstone formations of the United States
Tuff formations
Paleontology in Oregon
Formations
Formations